Johannes Bodaeus van Stapel (in Latin Ioannes Bodaeus a Stapel, in Italian Giovanni Bodeo da Stapel or Giovanni Bodeo da Stapelio, in French Jean/Johannes Bodaeus de Stapel or in Stapel), born in 1602 in Amsterdam, in the Dutch Republic, and died in 1636 in the same city, was a Dutch botanist and doctor.

Biography 
Giovanni Bodeo da Stapelio was born in Amsterdam in the early 17th century. His father, the physician Engelberto Stapel sent him to study in Leiden where his interest in botany was born. During his medical studies in Leiden, he was trained in botany by Adolphus Vorstius (1597-1663).

Work 
He is known for his work on the Latin version of Theophrastus' Historia plantarum, completed before his death in 1636 and published posthumously in Amsterdam in 1644 by his father. This work is an essential reference for western botanists of the time.

The Latin translation is that of Theodorus Gaz. This Latin version has 1,200 pages, with 50 black and white illustrations, out of text. The drawings of the plants and their parts are very schematic but very faithful to reality. Over the comments, Stapelio takes the opportunity to illustrate in an almost encyclopedic way the various botanical species and their applications. His colleague, the humanist Caspar Barlaeus, dedicated a poem to him in Latin.  Carl Linnaeus named, in his honor, the genus Stapelia of the family Apocynaceae.

References 

1602 births
1636 deaths
17th-century Dutch botanists
Physicians from Amsterdam
Scientists from Amsterdam
Pre-Linnaean botanists